Clemens Tönnies is a German billionaire who owns 45% of the meat processing company Tönnies Holding. Forbes estimates his wealth at 1.6 billion US dollars.

Life 
Tönnies was born as the son of the butcher Klemens Tönnies and his wife Maria in Rheda, where he grew up with six siblings. Clemens Tönnies took over the company after his brother Bernd Tönnies died of a lung infection following a heart attack in 1994.

Controversies

Investigation of tax evasion (2012) 
In 2012, German tax investigators searched Clemens Tönnies' office due to suspected tax evasion.

Omission in Tummel merger (2013) 
In January 2013, the German Federal Cartel Office fined Clemens Tönnies 90,000 euros (of the maximum 100,000) because he had omitted his shares in the  Group when attempting to merge his company with the slaughterhouse company Tummel. The Cartel Office cited the shares as a main reason for rejecting the merger.

CumEx deals (2014) 
Clemens Tönnies obtained public funds from the German tax administration via CumEx deals. In these deals, he obtained refunds of taxes he had never paid.

Price collusion and avoiding a 128m fine (2016) 
The Tönnies subsidiaries , Plumrose and  engaged in price fixing and were fined 128 million euros by the Federal Cartel Office. However, the antitrust agency was unable to obtain the fines, because Clemens Tönnies had transferred the companies' activities to the  Group and then liquidated the subsidiaries due to pay fines. As a result of this, the German government closed this loophole in September 2016.

Alleged racism (2019) 
In August 2019, Tönnies spoke at the  conference. He criticised the idea of raising certain taxes to fight climate change. In his talk, Tönnies suggested that Gerd Müller (CSU), at the time minister for Economic Cooperation and Development, "should finance power plants in Africa instead, and he will then send 20 large power plants to Africa every year. Then they will stop cutting down trees and they will stop producing children when it's dark, when we electrify them." This was widely criticised as racist, for instance by the German news magazine .

Covid outbreak (2020) 
In June 2020, government-mandated mass testing for SARS-CoV-2 found that at least 1,500 of 7,000 workers at the main Tönnies plant in Rheda-Wiedenbrück were infected. On 18 June 2020, parents and children held a demonstration in front of Tönnies’ house, since due to the danger of infection, schools and kindergartens had been closed.

Leaving the FC Schalke 04 board 
Fans of FC Schalke 04 demanded that Tönnies step down from the club's board, including with a human chain of around 1,000 fans around the stadium on 27 June 2020. Tönnies resigned on 30 June 2020 with immediate effect.

Dealing with criticism (2021) 
Clemens Tönnies has sued a camera team, which led the German TV show  to make an episode about how he deals with critics.

References 

German billionaires
1956 births
Living people